Driemanspolder is a RandstadRail station in Zoetermeer, the Netherlands.

History

The station opened, as a railway station, on 22 May 1977 as part of the Zoetermeerlijn, operating Zoetermeer Stadslijn services. The train station closed on 3 June 2006 and reopened as a RandstadRail station on 29 October 2007.

The station is linked via the Nelson Mandela Bridge to Zoetermeer station.

The station features 2 platforms. These platforms are low, and the same level as the tram doors, therefore making it step free.

Train services
The following services currently call at Driemanspolder:

Bus services
 77 (Centrum West - Voorweg RR - Meerzicht RR - Driemanspolder RR - Dorp RR - Zoetermeer Hoornerhage - Zoetermeer Oosterheem) - Veolia

The following bus services depart on the other side of the Nelson Mandela Bridge.

 52
 71 (Centrum West - Zoetermeer NS - Zoetermeer Rokkeveen West - Zoetermeer Rokkeveen Oost - Zoetermeer Oost NS - Centrum West) - Veolia
 72 (Centrum West - Zoetermeer Oost NS - Zoetermeer Rokkeveen Oost - Zoetermeer Rokkeveen Oost - Zoetermeer NS - Centrum West) - Veolia
 121 (Centrum West - Zoetermeer NS - Pijnacker Centrum - Delft University - Delft NS) - Veolia
 170 (Centrum West - Delftsewallen RR - Zoetermeer Oost NS - Zoetermeer NS - Berkel - Rotterdam Noord NS - Rotterdam Centraal NS) - Qbuzz
 204 (Centrum West - Zoetermeer NS - Zoetermeer Oost NS - Lansinghage - Bergschenhoek - Rotterdam Centraal NS) - Qbuzz (Fastbus)

Gallery

Railway stations opened in 1977
RandstadRail stations in Zoetermeer